A showgirl is a female dancer or performer in a stage entertainment show intended to showcase the performer's physical attributes, typically by way of revealing clothing, toplessness, or nudity.

History

Showgirls date back to the late 1800s in Parisian music halls and cabarets such as the Moulin Rouge, Le Lido, and the Folies Bergère. The trafficking of showgirls for the purposes of prostitution was the subject of a salacious novel by the nineteenth-century French author Ludovic Halévy.

The Las Vegas showgirl

The first casino on the Las Vegas Strip to employ dancing girls as a diversion between acts was the El Rancho Vegas in 1941. Showgirls were presented in Las Vegas in 1952 as the opening and closing act for Las Vegas headliners, sometimes dancing around the headliner.  They were introduced at the Sands Casino for a show with Danny Thomas. In 1957, Minsky's Follies took the stage at the Desert Inn giving birth to the topless showgirl in Vegas.  This was followed by a long-running The Lido de Paris at the Stardust Casino that ran for 31 years. Traditionally, Las Vegas showgirls are classically trained dancers with skills in Ballet and Jazz dance.

Revues with showgirls

 Calypso Cabaret (Bangkok, Thailand)
 Folies Bergère (Paris)
 Folies du Lac (Paris)
 Jubilee! Bally's (Las Vegas)
 La Nouvelle Eve (Paris)
 Le Lido (Paris)
 Moulin Rouge (Paris)
 Paradis Latin (Paris)
 Roderick Palazuelos 'Platinum Stars''' (México)
 Showgirl Bootcamp Experience (Las Vegas)
 Splash (Riviera, Las Vegas) (Frank Marino Show - La Cage)
 The Fabulous Palm Springs Follies (Palm Springs, California; unique in that the chorus line is of showgirls in their 50s, 60s and 70s)
 The Francis Show (Transvestite Show) (México)
 Tihany Spectacular Circus (Brazil-México)
 Tropicana Club (Havana, Cuba)
 Cabaret Red Light (Philadelphia, USA)
 VEGAS! THE SHOW (Las Vegas)
 VIVA Cabaret Showbar (Blackpool, UK)
 90 Degrees & Rising (Dunes Hotel & Casino, Las Vegas)

 Showgirls in popular culture 

 The Gold Diggers films, including The Gold Diggers (silent, 1923), Gold Diggers of Broadway (1929), Gold Diggers of 1933 (1933), Gold Diggers of 1935 (1935), Gold Diggers of 1937 (1936), and Gold Diggers in Paris (1938)
 Bolero, a 1934 film in which American burlesque dancer Sally Rand played a carnival showgirl and performed a fan dance
 The Golddiggers, a troupe that performed on The Dean Martin Show beginning in 1968
 Showgirls, a 1995 film directed by Paul Verhoeven and starring Elizabeth Berkley
 Guys and Dolls, a 1950 Broadway production, depicts a Miss Adelaide as the main character's fiancée, a singer and showgirl in various musical numbers.
 Kylie Minogue was inspired by different types of showgirls and named and styled her Showgirl: The Greatest Hits Tour and Showgirl: The Homecoming Tour concerts after them. Showgirl themes can be seen at many corners through Minogue's entire career.
 Several showgirl cars are seen at the Dinoco booth during the animated film Cars''; former Motorama show car Flo displays vanity licence plate SHOGRL as a "Motorama 1957 showgirl".

References

Theatrical occupations
Variety shows
Dance occupations
 
Entertainment occupations
Gendered occupations